Statistics of Primera División de México for the 1993–94 season.

Overview
It was contested by 20 teams, and Tecos won the championship.

Toros Neza was promoted from Segunda División. The team started the season in Ciudad Nezahualcóyotl, however, the use of the Neza 86 Stadium was denied by the Mexican Football Federation, for this reason, the team was moved to Pachuca and changed its name to Toros Hidalgo.

Querétaro was relegated to Segunda División.

Teams

Moves
After this season U. de G. franchise was sold to a group of 15 Segunda Division clubs to form an intermediate division called Primera Division "A", between Primera Division and Segunda Division. The new owners disappeared the team.

Group stage

Group 1

Group 2

Group 3

Group 4

Results

Playoff

 If the two teams are tied after two legs, the higher-seeded team advances.

Repechaje round

Morelia won 5-4 on aggregate.

America won 4-2 on aggregate.

Quarterfinal

Tecos won 6-0 on aggregate.

América won 2-3 on aggregate.

Santos Laguna won 3-2 on aggregate.

Toluca won 4-3 on aggregate.

Semifinal

Aggregate tied 4-4. Tecos won the series because the team had a better position in general table

Santos Laguna won 1-2 on aggregate.

Final

Tecos won 2-1 on aggregate

Relegation table

References
Mexico - List of final tables (RSSSF)

Liga MX seasons
1993–94 in Mexican football
Mex